Marlin Eller is an American programmer who was a manager and a software developer at Microsoft Corporation from 1982–1995, and he was development lead for the Graphics Device Interface of Windows 1.0 and also for Pen Windows. He was also a co-founder and the CEO of Sunhawk Digital Music LLC. He was later chairman of the game development company Reflexive Entertainment.

Eller also co-authored the book Barbarians Led by Bill Gates with Jennifer Edstrom.

Eller received his Bachelor of Arts in Mathematics from Whitman College in 1974. He then went on for his Master of Science in Mathematics from the University of Washington.

See also
Pen computing

Bibliography
 1995 Multiple-Scattering Calculations of X-Ray Absorption Spectra, The American Physical Society
 1998 Barbarians Led by Bill Gates'', co-authored with Jennifer Edstrom, Henry Holt, Inc., 256 pp.,

References

Computer programmers
Whitman College alumni
Living people
Year of birth missing (living people)